In graph theory, the hypergraph removal lemma states that when a hypergraph contains few copies of a given sub-hypergraph, then all of the copies can be eliminated by removing a small number of hyperedges. It is a generalization of the graph removal lemma. The special case in which the graph is a tetrahedron is known as the tetrahedron removal lemma. It was first proved by Nagle, Rödl, Schacht and Skokan and, independently, by Gowers.

The hypergraph removal lemma can be used to prove results such as Szemerédi's theorem and the multi-dimensional Szemerédi theorem.

Statement 

Proof idea of the hypergraph removal lemma 
The high level idea of the proof is similar to that of graph removal lemma. We prove a hypergraph version of Szemerédi's regularity lemma (partition hypergraphs into pseudorandom blocks) and a counting lemma (estimate the number of hypergraphs in an appropriate pseudorandom block). The key difficulty in the proof is to define the correct notion of hypergraph regularity. There were multiple attempts to define "partition" and "pseudorandom (regular) blocks" in a hypergraph, but none of them are able to give a strong counting lemma. The first correct definition of Szemerédi's regularity lemma for general hypergraphs is given by Rödl et al.

In Szemerédi's regularity lemma, the partitions are performed on vertices (1-hyperedge) to regulate edges (2-hyperedge). The correct version has to partition -hyperedges in order to regulate -hyperedges. To gain more control of the -hyperedges, we can go a level deeper and partition on -hyperedges to regulate them, etc. In the end, we will reach a complex structure of regulating hyperedges.

Proof idea for 3-uniform hypergraphs 
For example, we demonstrate an informal 3-hypergraph version of Szemerédi's regularity lemma, first given by Frankl and Rödl. Consider a partition of edges such that for most triples  there are a lot of triangles on top of  We say that  is "pseudorandom" in the sense that for all subgraphs  with not too few triangles on top of  we have

We then subsequently define a regular partition as a partition in which the triples of parts that are not regular constitute at most an  fraction of all triples of parts in the partition.

In addition to this, we need to further regularize  via a partition of the vertex set. As a result, we have the total data of hypergraph regularity as follows:

a partition of  into graphs such that  sits pseudorandomly on top;
a partition of  such that the graphs in (1) are extremely pseudorandom (in a fashion resembling Szemerédi's regularity lemma).

After proving the hypergraph regularity lemma, we can prove a hypergraph counting lemma. The rest of proof proceeds similarly to that of Graph removal lemma.

Proof of Szemerédi's theorem 
Let  be the size of the largest subset of  that does not contain a length  arithmetic progression. Szemerédi's theorem states that,  for any constant . The high level idea of the proof is that, we construct a hypergraph from a subset without any length  arithmetic progression, then use graph removal lemma to show that this graph cannot have too many hyperedges, which in turn shows that the original subset cannot be too big.

Let  be a subset that does not contain any length  arithmetic progression. Let  be a large enough integer.

For each , we add a hyperedge among vertices  if and only if  Let  be the complete -partite -uniform hypergraph. However, note that  is a length  arithmetic progression with common difference . Since  has no length  arithmetic progression, it must be the case that , so .

Thus, for each hyperedge , we can find a unique copy of  that this edge lies in by finding . Thus, .

This method usually does not give a good quantitative bound, since the hidden constants in hypergraph removal lemma involves the inverse Ackermann function. It is the best bound for  so far.

Applications 

 The hypergraph removal lemma is used to prove the multidimensional Szemerédi theorem by J. Solymosi. Corners theorem is a special case when .
 It is also used to prove the polynomial Szemerédi theorem, the finite field Szemerédi theorem and the finite abelian group Szemerédi theorem.

See also 

 Graph removal lemma
 Szemerédi's theorem
Problems involving arithmetic progressions

References 

Hypergraphs
Graph theory